Jan Henrik Kayser (20 February 1933 – 24 April 2016) was a Norwegian classical pianist.

He was born in Bergen. He made his concert debut in 1953, and is known as performer of Harald Sæverud's compositions. He was awarded Griegprisen in 1978.

References

1933 births
2016 deaths
Musicians from Bergen
Norwegian classical pianists